Slough is a town in the unitary authority of the same name in Berkshire, England,  bordering Greater London. It is part of the historic county of Buckinghamshire. In 2020, the built-up area subdivision had an estimated population of 164,793. In 2011, the district had a population of 140,713.

Slough's population is one of the most ethnically diverse in the United Kingdom, attracting people from across the country and the world for labour since the 1920s, which has helped shape it into a major trading centre. In 2017, unemployment stood at 1.4%, one-third the UK average of 4.5%.

Slough has the highest concentration of UK HQs of global companies outside London. Slough Trading Estate is the largest industrial estate in single private ownership in Europe, with over 17,000 jobs in 400 businesses. Blackberry, McAfee, Burger King, DHL, Telefonica and Lego have head offices in the town.

History

The name was first recorded in 1195 as Slo. It first seems to have applied to a hamlet between Upton to the east and Chalvey to the west, roughly around the "Crown Crossroads" where the road to Windsor (now the A332) met the Great West Road. The Domesday Survey of 1086 refers to Upton, and a wood for 200 pigs, worth £15. During the 13th century, King Henry III had a palace at Cippenham. Parts of Upton Court were built in 1325, while St Mary the Virgin Church in Langley was probably built in the late 11th or early 12th century, though it has been rebuilt and enlarged several times.

From the mid-17th century, stagecoaches began to pass through Slough and Salt Hill (later absorbed into Slough), which became locations for the second stage to change horses on the journey out from London. By 1838 and the opening of the Great Western Railway, Upton-cum-Chalvey's parish population had reached 1,502. In 1849, a branch line was completed from Slough to Windsor & Eton Central, opposite Windsor Castle, for Queen Victoria's convenience.

Slough has 96 listed buildings. There are
 Four Grade I: St Laurence's Church (Upton), St Mary the Virgin Church, Langley, Baylis House and Godolphin Court
 Seven Grade II*: St Mary's Church (Upton-cum-Chalvey), Upton Court, the Kederminster and Seymour Almshouses in Langley, St Peter's Church (Chalvey), Ostrich Inn (Colnbrook) and King John's Palace (Colnbrook)
 Grade II listed structures include four milestones, Beech, Oak and Linden Houses at Upton Hospital, St Ethelbert's Church, Slough and Slough railway station.

1918 saw a large area of agricultural land to the west of Slough developed as an army motor repair depot, used to store and repair huge numbers of motor vehicles coming back from the battlefields of the First World War in Flanders. In April 1920, the Government sold the site and its contents to the Slough Trading Co. Ltd. Repair of ex-army vehicles continued until 1925, when the Slough Trading Company Act was passed allowing the company (renamed Slough Estates Ltd) to establish an industrial estate. Spectacular growth and employment ensued, with Slough attracting workers from many parts of the UK and abroad. Slough Town Hall, which was designed by Charles Holloway James and Stephen Rowland Pierce, was completed in 1937.

During the Second World War, Slough experienced a series of air raids, mostly in October 1940 (the largest number of people, five, dying as a result of a raid on the 13th), and an emergency hospital treating casualties from London was set up in Slough. Local air raid deaths and deaths at the hospital account for the 23 civilian lives recorded lost in the borough area.

After the war, several further large housing developments arose to take large numbers of people migrating from war-damaged London.  Between 1955 and 1957 the town was the site of the Slough experiment, a large-scale road safety trial.

The old Slough library was opened on 28 November 1974. It was officially called the Robert Taylor Library, named after Alderman Taylor in recognition of his contribution to the library service. The library was officially opened by the Mayor, Councillor DR Peters, on 15 May 1975. It was demolished in May 2017 as part of the programme of redevelopment in the town centre.

Redevelopment

In the 21st century, Slough has seen major redevelopment of the town centre. Old buildings are being replaced with new offices and shopping complexes. Tesco has replaced an existing superstore with a larger Tesco Extra. The Heart of Slough Project is plan for the large-scale redevelopment of the town centre as a focus and cultural quarter for the creative media, information and communications industries created a mixed-use complex, multi-functional buildings, visual landmarks and a public space in the Thames Valley. Approval was given for the £400 million project by Slough Borough Council's planning committee on 9 July 2009, and work began in 2010 for completion in 2018.

In December 2009, two key components of the project were signed: the Homes and Communities Agency (HCA) signed its agreement to provide £11m of funding for infrastructure and Thames Valley University (TVU) courses which were due to remain in the town found a new home at the Centre in Farnham Road, Slough. In parallel to the town centre redevelopment plan, Segro (owner of the Slough Trading Estate) planned to spend £600 million over the following 20 years on the estate. This was intended to create environmentally sustainable buildings, open green spaces, two hotels, a conference centre, cafés, restaurants and better transport facilities to improve links to Slough town centre and the surrounding residential areas. It wAs claimed that the plan would create more than 4,100 new jobs and contribute around £100m a year to Slough's economy. If both plans went ahead, nearly £1 billion would be spent on redeveloping Slough over the next 20 years.

In 2009, Herschel Park (known as Upton Park until 1949), named for astronomer William Herschel, was relandscaped in a multimillion-pound effort to bring it back to its former Victorian era glory. The park was featured in an episode of the documentary programme Who Do You Think You Are? focusing on the TV presenter Davina McCall.

In 2010, £2 million was set aside to improve disabled access to Slough railway station in preparation for an expected increase in use during the 2012 London Olympics. Preparations were under way for the regeneration of the Britwell suburb of Slough, involving tearing down a dilapidated block of flats and the closing of the public house the Jolly Londoner in Wentworth Avenue and replacing them with new homes, as well as relocating the shopping parade in the street to nearby Kennedy Park. 

As part of the Heart of Slough project, construction work on a new bus station began in March 2010, following weeks of demolition work to half of the existing bus station and the removal of Compair House near the railway station. It was opened in May 2011.

Redevelopment on this scale has been strongly criticised by conservation groups. The Twentieth Century Society has stated that
[A] tragically high quantity of good buildings have been demolished in Slough in recent years, including grand Art-Deco-styled factories by the likes of Wallis Gilbert and high-quality post-war offices. More are to come down as the town tries to erase its past and reinvent itself from scratch. Despite famously heckling Slough, John Betjeman's praise for the town hall's architecture as 'a striving for unity out of chaos' in 1948 has never been so relevant as today. C20 believes that the redevelopment of the town hall would be an act of vandalism to the civic centre and is supporting the Campaign to Save Slough's Heritage in their request for a review of the decision.

During November 2016, the Slough Queensmere and Observatory shopping centres were sold to Abu Dhabi Investment Authority (ADIA) in a deal worth £130 million.

Geography
Slough is within the Greater London Urban Area and on the border with London Borough of Hillingdon and London Borough of Hounslow. Heathrow Airport is 5 miles away. Nearby towns are Uxbridge to the northeast and Beaconsfield to the north.

Most of the area that now makes up Slough was anciently part of Buckinghamshire, however, Poyle was historically in Middlesex. The town developed by the expansion and amalgamation of villages along the Great West Road. Over the years Slough has expanded greatly, incorporating a number of different villages. Original villages that are now suburbs of Slough include Chalvey, Cippenham, Colnbrook, Langley, Poyle, Upton, and Wexham.

Named neighbourhoods include Brands Hill, Britwell, Huntercombe, Manor Park, Salt Hill, Upton Lea and Windsor Meadows. The urban area merges into the neighbouring parishes of Burnham, a small area of Taplow near Cippenham, Farnham Royal and Stoke Poges which remain in the county of Buckinghamshire and Datchet which is in Berkshire. Eton is narrowly buffered by the Jubilee River and by green space (mainly the college playing fields) from part of Slough, and the two areas formerly formed the Eton birth, marriages and deaths registration district.

Climate
This part of the Thames Valley is notable for generally having the warmest daytime summer temperatures on average in the British Isles. Typically, according to 1981–2010 normals, the average high temperature in July is 23.5 °C (74.3 °F.)

Rainfall is low compared to most of the British Isles, with under  annually, and 105 days reporting over 1 mm of rain.

Demography

During the Great Depression of the 1930s, many unemployed Welsh people who walked up the Great West Road looking for employment settled in Slough.

According to the 2011 census, 45.7% of the population was white (34.5% white British, 1.1% white Irish, 0.2% gypsy or Irish Traveller, 9.9% other white), 3.4% of mixed race (1.2% white and black Caribbean, 0.4% white and black African, 1.0% white and Asian, 0.8% other mixed), 39.7% Asian (17.7% Indian, 15.6% Pakistani, 0.4% Bangladeshi, 0.6% Chinese, 5.4% other Asian), 8.6% black (5.4% African, 2.2% Caribbean, 1.0% other black), 0.7% Arab and 1.9% of other ethnic heritage.
In the post-war years, immigrants from the Commonwealth, notably Anguilla, Antigua and Barbuda, India and Pakistan came to the town. There is also a significant Irish and London-Irish population from London overspill.

In the early 1950s, there were a number of Polish refugee camps scattered around the Slough area. As returning to Poland (then in the Soviet Bloc) was not considered an option by many of the wartime refugees, many Polish families decided to settle in Slough. In time, a Polish-speaking Roman Catholic parish was established with its own church building. A new wave of Polish migration to Slough has followed since Poland became part of the European Union.

Slough Council elected the country's first black female mayor, Lydia Simmons, in 1984.

Figures from the 2011 census showed that 41.2% of Slough's population identified as Christian, 23.3% as Muslim, 10.6% as Sikh, 6.2% as Hindu, 0.5% as Buddhist, 0.1% as Jewish, 0.3% as having other religions, 12.1% as having no religion and 5.7% did not answer the question. Slough has the highest percentage of Sikh residents in the country according to the census figures. Slough also has the highest percentage of Muslim and Hindu residents in the South East region.

 {|class="wikitable sortable"
|+ Immigrants in Slough (2011 census)
! Country of birth
! Number resident
|-
|
|11,544
|-
|
|11,244
|-
|
|8,341
|-
|
|2,183
|-
|
|1,364
|-
|
|1,352
|-
|
|1,247
|-
|
|1,219
|-
|
|828
|-
|
|759
|-
|}

In July 2007 Slough was the subject of a documentary by the BBC's Panorama series, entitled  "Immigration – how we lost count". The programme highlighted Slough and other affordable towns close to London had a much greater rise in the EU immigrant population than had been nationally predicted and for which resources had been allocated. The programme found certain public services failing to deliver to expected standards and with large groups selecting a small area in which to live, an increase in overcrowding.

Governance

Boundaries
In 1863, Slough became a local government area when a Slough Local Board of Health was elected to represent what is now the central part of the modern Borough. This part of Upton-cum-Chalvey Civil Parish became Slough Urban Sanitary District in 1875. The functions of these two bodies were strengthened in 1894, when Slough Urban District was created, Buckinghamshire County Council having been created in the previous decade. In 1930, there was a major extension westward of the Urban District, and the area was divided into electoral wards for the first time (the new areas of Burnham (Beeches), Farnham (Royal) and Stoke (Poges) (commonly used suffixes) as well as the divisions of the old district Central, Chalvey, Langley and Upton). In 1938, the town became a Municipal Borough by Royal Charter.

Slough was transferred to Berkshire in the 1974 local government reorganisation. The old Municipal Borough was abolished and not deemed part of an urban conglomeration, replaced by a non-city type second-tier authority (Non-metropolitan district), which was however made a Borough by the town's second Royal Charter. Britwell and Wexham Court became part of Slough at this time, with their civil parish councils. On 1 April 1995, the Borough of Slough expanded slightly into Buckinghamshire and Surrey, to take in Colnbrook and Poyle and merged their civil parish councils.

Slough became a unitary authority, on 1 April 1998. This coincided with the abolition of Berkshire County Council and the dissolution of its Borough Status received under its second Royal Charter. However, to enable the continued use of the word Borough, as in some other parts of Berkshire, Slough received its third Royal Charter in 1998.

Since 2015, Slough has had a Youth Parliament to represent the views of younger people.

Town twinning
Slough is twinned with:
  Montreuil, France (since 1988)

Economy

Before the 19th century, the main businesses of Slough were brickfields and agriculture. The bricks for the building of Eton College were made in Slough. Later, as the Great West Road traffic increased, inns and pubs sprang up along the road to service the passing trade. Until the town developed as an industrial area, nurseries were prominent in the local economy; the Cox's Orange Pippin apple was first raised in Colnbrook (not then within Slough) around 1825, and the dianthus "Mrs Sinkins Pink" was first raised at some point between 1868 and 1883 by John Sinkins, the master of the Eton Union Workhouse, which lay in Slough.

In the mid-19th century, the only major employer apart from the brickfields was James Elliman, who started as a draper in Chandos Street. In 1847, he changed business and manufactured his Elliman's Embrocation and Royal Embrocation horse liniment at factories in Wellington Street and Chandos Street. Elliman became a major benefactor to the town, and is remembered today in the names of local roads and schools.

In September 1851, William Thomas Buckland, an auctioneer and surveyor from nearby Wraysbury, began livestock sales in a field near the Great Western Road Railway Station belonging to the North Star Inn. Originally held on the first Tuesday of every month, the Cattle Market's popularity soon saw this increased to every Tuesday. A move to Wexham Street was necessitated by the postwar redevelopment of the town. The Slough Cattle Market was run by Messrs Buckland and Sons until its final closure in 1988.

In 1906, James Horlick, one of the founders of the eponymous malted milk company, opened a purpose-built red-brick factory near Slough Railway Station to manufacture his malted milk product. In 2015, the business was sold by Glaxo Smith Kline and in 2017, manufacturing at the site ceased altogether. The site is currently proposed to become residential making use of the original buildings as much as possible.

Starting in the 1920s, Slough Estates Ltd, the operator of the original Slough Trading Estate, created and operated many more estates in the UK and abroad. The Slough Trading Estate meant that the town was largely insulated from many of the effects of recession. For many years, Slough's economy was mainly manufacturing-based.

In the last 20 or so years, there has been a major shift from a manufacturing to an information-based economy, with the closure of many factories (some of which had been in Slough for many decades). The factories are rapidly being replaced by office buildings. Hundreds of major companies have sited in Slough Trading Estate over the years, with its proximity to London Heathrow Airport and good motorway connections being attractive. In the 1960s, Gerry Anderson's film company was based in Slough, and his Supermarionation series, including Thunderbirds, were filmed there.

The UK headquarters of Mars, Incorporated is in Slough, the main factory having been established in 1932 by Forrest Mars Sr. and Frank C. Mars. It produced the Mars Bar in Slough over 70 years ago. One of the Mars factories has been demolished and some production has moved to the Czech Republic. The European head offices of major IT companies such as BlackBerry, McAfee, Computer Associates, PictureTel and Compusys (among others) are all in the town. O2 is headquartered in the town across four buildings. The town is also home to the business support organisation Thames Valley Chamber of Commerce Group and National Foundation for Educational Research, which is housed in the Mere.

Recent new offices include those of Nintendo, Black and Decker and Abbey business centres. The registered office of Furniture Village lies in the town.

The motor trade has long been represented in Slough. Until 1966, Citroën assembled cars in a Liverpool Road factory (later used by Mars Confectionery), and it retains its UK headquarters in the town. Ford built D Series and Cargo lorries at its factory in Langley (a former Hawker Aircraft site) from 1936 to the 1950s until the site was redeveloped for housing in the 1990s. Ferrari, Mercedes, Fiat and Maserati now have offices in the town.

Transport

Road

Many people from Slough work in nearby towns and cities such as Windsor, Reading, London and Bracknell, and there are large passenger movements in the morning and evening rush hours. Road transport in Slough includes:
 Within Slough: Buses (First Berkshire & The Thames Valley, Arriva Shires & Essex, Redline & Carousel Buses (only Sundays)), taxis, minicabs and private cars on roads are also used.
 To Heathrow Airport: First Berkshire & The Thames Valley bus routes 75, 76, 77 and 78 serve Slough town centre, Langley and Heathrow Airport. First also run bus routes 71 (via Windsor, Egham & Staines-upon-Thames) and 60/61 (via Datchet, Horton & Wraysbury) to Heathrow Terminal 5. Taxis and minicabs are also available at a higher cost.
 To Central London: Buses and Greenline coaches are available, but rail is more generally used as express trains connect Slough to London Paddington in 14 minutes.
 To Birmingham: Bharat Coaches provide services from Southall to Birmingham/Wolverhampton/Coventry/Leeds/Bradford and Leicester via Slough.
 Slough is bounded by the M4 to the south and is served by junctions 5, 6 and 7; other roads serving the town include the A4, A355, and A412.

Rail
Slough is served by Great Western Railway stations at Burnham, Slough and Langley.
Slough station is a junction between the Great Western Main Line and the Slough to Windsor & Eton Line to allow passengers to connect for Windsor & Eton Central.

Reading: Great Western Railway operate fast services to Reading every half an hour which take about 15 minutes, as well as slow services every fifteen minutes which take 30 minutes.

London Paddington: Great Western Railway operate express services to London every half an hour which take 14 minutes, as well as slow services every fifteen minutes taking 26 minutes.

Slough has services on the Elizabeth line, a new railway line across central London opened in 2022

The Western Rail Approach to Heathrow is a £500m rail project announced by the Department for Transport; Network Rail announced the route in 2014. It will directly serve Slough with four trains every hour, reducing travel times to Heathrow to six minutes. It is expected to be operational in the early 2020s.

Cycling
National Cycle Network route 61 runs through central Slough. A Smoove bike sharing system was launched in October 2013, targeting commuters travelling between the trading estate and nearby railway stations.

Canal
Slough is connected by the Slough Arm to the main line of the Grand Union Canal which runs between the Thames at Brentford and Birmingham. It travels from the terminus basin at Stoke Road to the junction with the main line at Cowley Peachey; it was restored to navigability in 1975 having been disused since 1960.

Sports
Slough has a senior non-League football team, Slough Town F.C., who currently play in the National League South. Slough also host the ice hockey team, the Slough Jets. They play in NIHL South Division 1.

Reading F.C. Womens and Republic of Ireland Womens goalkeeper Grace Moloney was born and lives in the town.

Education

There are numerous primary and secondary schools serving Slough. In addition, East Berkshire College has a campus in the area. Slough schools are in the top 10 best performers in the country at GCSE level. In 2011, 68.1% of pupils left school with a minimum of 5 A*-C grades (with English and maths). The national average is 58.9%.

Thames Valley University (Slough Campus) is currently closed due to the Heart of Slough project. The new campus was scheduled to be opened in 2013 as part of the University of West London, but as of March 2022 there had been no progress, as the former site of the university had been sold for housing.

Cultural references

 1597: In Act IV, Scene 5 of Shakespeare's The Merry Wives of Windsor, Bardolph is mugged: "so soon as I came beyond Eton, (cozenors) threw me off, from behind one of them, in a slough of mire". This could be a reference to Slough. In the same scene Cole-brooke (Colnbrook) is referenced along with Reading and Maidenhead.
 1872: Edward Lear made reference to Slough in More Nonsense Pictures, Rhymes, Botany, etc:
There was an old person of Slough,
Who danced at the end of a bough;
But they said, 'If you sneeze,
You might damage the trees,
You imprudent old person of Slough.'''
 1932: (but set in the 26th century) In Aldous Huxley's Brave New World, the chimneys of Slough Crematorium, around which Bernard Marx flies, are used to demonstrate the physio-chemical equality of all people. (Slough's actual crematorium, in the cemetery in Stoke Road, was opened in 1963, coincidentally the year of Huxley's death. Princess Margaret was cremated there in 2002.)
 1937: The poet John Betjeman wrote his poem Slough as a protest against the new town and 850 factories that had arisen in what had been formerly a rural area, which he considered an onslaught on the rural lifestyle:Come, friendly bombs and fall on SloughIt isn't fit for humans nowThere isn't grass to graze a cow.Swarm over, death!The poem was published two years before the outbreak of the Second World War, in which Britain (including Slough itself) experienced bombing from enemy air raids. On the centenary of his birth, his daughter said her father "regretted having ever written it", presenting the then Mayor David MacIsaac with a book of his poems in which she had written: "We love Slough".
 1979: Slough is mentioned by name in the hit single "The Eton Rifles" by The Jam from the album Setting Sons: "There's a row going on down near Slough"
 1991: Film Buddy's Song with externals filmed mainly on the Britwell Estate and the Farnham Road (A355) released.
 1996: The Tiger Lillies' album The Brothel to the Cemetery includes a track called "Slough", probably inspired by Betjeman's poem. The lyrics to the chorus are:Drop a bomb on Slough, Drop a bomb on SloughDrop a bomb on Slough, Drop a bomb on Slough 1998: The song "Costa del Slough" by the rock band Marillion posits the town as a post-global warming coastal resort, possibly in a reference to the comedian Spike Milligan having presented Slough on TV as a holiday resort.
 2001: The BBC comedy series The Office was set in the sales office of a paper company in Slough, presenting it as a depressing post-industrial wasteland. The character David Brent comments on Betjeman's poem in the series, which also appears on the inside sleeve of the video and DVD of Series 1. In the US version, the office is located on "Slough Avenue" in Scranton, Pennsylvania.
 2004: Slough is mentioned on the ABC series Lost in the episode "Homecoming" of Season 1. In a flashback of Charlie's life, a woman he knows says her father is away purchasing a paper company in Slough. It is possible that this is a reference to The Office.
 2009: In episode 8, Series 1 of The Legend of Dick and Dom, a CBBC show, the characters find themselves in modern-day Slough.
 2010-2022: In the novels by Mick Herron and the Apple+ TV series, Slow Horses, Slough House is the MI5 branch where washed-up spies are sent to finish their failed careers on desk duty. The name derives from the fact that, as Slough is distant from London, similarly Slough House is equally far away from the headqurters of MI5 in Regents Park for the disgraced spies hoping to revive their careers.
 2015: Sky One comedy drama series You, Me and the Apocalypse is set in Slough where a nuclear bunker is located underneath the Slough Trading Estate. Aerial views are seen of Slough throughout the series.
 2016: Ricky Gervais, in his role as David Brent, released the song Slough on his album Life on the Road, the soundtrack to the film by the same title. The chorus runs:Oh oh oh Slough (echo: Slough)My kind of townI don't know howAnyone could put you down''

Crime
Slough has a relatively high crime rate; figures for all crime categories are annually above the English average and figures for a few categories are at more than double the frequency. According to British Crime Survey statistics, as of September 2013, Slough had the second worst rate of crime among local authority areas in the Thames Valley Police counties (87 recorded crimes per 1,000 population vs Oxford's 104). However the borough's crime rate reduced by 29% in the ten years to 2013. In the year ending September 2017, the crime rate in Slough was the third highest in the Thames Valley force area, behind Reading (96.42 police recorded crimes per 1000 population) and Oxford (100.71 for the same metric).

See also
 List of people from Slough

Notes

References

External links

 
 Slough Borough Council
Slough History Online

 
Towns in Berkshire
Unparished areas in Berkshire